Fujairah F1 Independent Water and Power Plant or Fujairah F1 IWPP is an independent water and power plant (IWPP) at Qidfa', Fujairah in the United Arab Emirates. It is located next to the Fujairah F2 IWPP. When constructed, the Fujairah plant was the first hybrid plant in the Middle East, and the largest desalination hybrid plant in the world.

History

A construction contract was awarded to Doosan Heavy Industries & Construction Company in June 2001 and the contract was signed in June 2002. In August 2001, a contract for the transmission systems was awarded to a joint venture of Al Jaber Energy Services and Technip. The first few liters of potable water were produced in April 2004. Total construction costs of the project were US$1.2 billion In June 2009 Sembcorp had announced that it had successfully boosted F1's power capacity by at least 40%.

Technical description
The Fujairah plant has an installed power capacity of 760 MW and it produces  of water per day. It is a natural gas-fired plant supplied from  the Dolphin Gas Project through the Al Ain-Fujairah pipeline.

The water production system consists of five MSF units producing  of water each and one RO unit. Potable water is stored in five tanks,  each. The water output is pumped to Sweihan through a  dual pipeline with an  spur to Al Dhaid in Sharjah.

Operating company
The plant was originally owned by the Union Water and Electricity Company (UWEC), established in June 2001 as a government owned company through the Abu Dhabi Water and Electricity Authority (ADWEA). The plant was operated and maintained by Sogex Oman under agreement with UWEC.  In 2006, 40% stake in UWEC was sold to Singapore-based Sembcorp Utilities and SembCorp took over the plant's operating activities.  After privatization the company was renamed Emirates SembCorp Water and Power Company.

Emirates Sembcorp Water & Power Co issued $400 million of senior secured project bonds in 2017 rated A2 by Moody's and rated A− by S&P. The offering was led by Citigroup and HSBC. Debt offerings like these are relatively new to the Middle East.

Future expansion
The DBO work was completed in December 2015 & currently the Plant is under Acciona Infrastructures SA & Acciona Agua JV.The Plant uses Dissolved Air flotation (DAF) & Dual media filter (DMF) for pre-treatment of the raw water.

See also

 Reverse osmosis plant
 Fujairah F2 IWPP

References

External links 
 Official website

2002 establishments in the United Arab Emirates
Energy infrastructure completed in 2004
Natural gas-fired power stations in the United Arab Emirates
Integrated water and power plants
Buildings and structures in the Emirate of Fujairah
Economy of the Emirate of Fujairah
Water supply and sanitation in the United Arab Emirates